Osman Saqizli (literally, Osman Pasha of Chios) (died 1672), (r.1649-72) was Dey and Pasha of Tripolis. He was born into a Greek Christian family on the island of Chios (known in Ottoman Turkish as Sakız, hence his epithet "Sakızlı") and had converted to Islam. His rule was effective, continuing the policy of his predecessor Mehmed Saqizli. He occupied Cyrenaica, and was tolerant in religious matters. Anyway, the damages caused by the Tripoli's Pirates to the European trade put him often in conflict with the European powers. Due to that, Tripoli was bombed in retaliation in 1654 by the British Navy under Robert Blake, in 1662 by the Dutch Navy under Michiel de Ruyter, and in 1669 ad 1672 by the French Navy. He died in 1672, and with his death started a period of instability for his country.

See also
Pasha of Tripoli

Notes

References

Pashas
1672 deaths
Ottoman Tripolitania
17th-century Libyan people
Year of birth unknown
People from the Ottoman Empire of Greek descent
Converts to Islam from Eastern Orthodoxy
Greek former Christians
Politicians from Chios
Former Greek Orthodox Christians
17th-century rulers in Africa